Leila Otadi is an Iranian actress.

Early life and education 

Leila was born in Tehran/Shemrian. At age of 7, she had a chance to begin acting in films. However, her family and she thought school was more important for her at the time than acting. She was introduced to stage acting at the age of 18. Leila’s film debut was "Black Eyes" by Iraj Ghaderi. Since then, she has starred in many films and recently became the highest paying actress in Iran. She speaks Persian and Turkish fluently and plays tennis, enjoys horseback riding and many other sports.

She earned her Associate degree in Interior Architecture from the Tehran University of Art.

Career 
Her debut movie was ' The Black Eyes' (2002), directed by Iraj Qaderi.

Otadi has participated in various TV series, including 'Truth Revealed' (2004), 'Tears and Smiles' (2008), 'Blood Money' (2010) and 'The Wound' (2014).

She has also appeared in the movies ‘Willow Tree' (2004), 'Left-Handed' (2005), 'Invitation' (2008), 'Looking For Happiness' (2009), 'The Outcasts 3' (2010), 'Messed Up' (2011), ‘Laleh’ (2013) and 'The Straw Dogs' (2013).

She has begun reciting poems since she was 17 years-old, and published her first book in 2014 under the title of  'In Heaven There is No Crow, Nor Scarecrow', which is a collection of poetry, in both Persian and English languages.

Political Controversy
In November 2010 it was reported that she was going to appear in a political movie to demonstrate how Neda Agha Soltan was killed on the streets of Tehran in 2009. Since this movie had been funded by the government of Iran her decision sparked a flood of negative emotions against her in Iran and abroad. This was followed by a successful attack on her personal website that aimed to replace her pictures with some photos of the very last moments of Neda Agha Soltan covered in blood. On 11 November, this was denied by Fars News Agency.

Filmography

Television series

Film

References

External links

 عکس لیلا اوتادی روی بیلبوردهای عراق برای تبلیغ یک نوشیدنی
 

1983 births
Living people
People from Tehran
Actresses from Tehran
Iranian film actresses
Iranian television actresses
21st-century Iranian actresses